This is a list of Belarus national football team results from 1992 to the 2009.

1990s

1992

1993

1994

1995

1996

1997

1998

1999

2000s

2000

2001

2002

2003

2004

2005

2006

2007

2008

2009

References 

1990s in Belarus
2000s in Belarus
Belarus national football team results